Blakstad or Blakstad-Osedalen is a village which is also the administrative centre of the municipality of Froland in Agder county, Norway.

Originally, Blakstad was the village on the eastern shore of the river and the village of Osedalen was located on the western side of the river. Over the years, the two villages grew together and now form one large village.

The Arendalsbanen railway line, a branch of the Sørlandsbanen railway line stops at the Blakstad Station. The Norwegian County Road 42 and Norwegian County Road 408 also run through the village.

Media gallery

See also
 Froland (village)

References

Villages in Agder
Froland